Undolsky is a rural locality (a settlement) in Kopninskoye Rural Settlement, Sobinsky District, Vladimir Oblast, Russia. The population was 409 as of 2010. There are 4 streets.

Geography 
Undolsky is located 9 km northwest of Sobinka (the district's administrative centre) by road. Lakinsk is the nearest rural locality.

References 

Rural localities in Sobinsky District